Bolshoy Kholm is a rural locality (a village) in Oktyabrskoye Rural Settlement, Vyaznikovsky District, Vladimir Oblast, Russia. The population was 64 as of 2010.

Geography 
Bolshoy Kholm is located 12 km west of Vyazniki (the district's administrative centre) by road. Igumentsevo is the nearest rural locality.

References 

Rural localities in Vyaznikovsky District